The Three Bells of Fira, officially known as The Catholic Church of the Dormition, is a Greek Catholic church on the island of Santorini. The church is known for its blue dome, three bells and views. The building is located in the town of Fira, directly above the cliffs which dominate western Santorini.

History 
The site of the modern Three Bells of Fira has been occupied by a number of other buildings. In the mid-17th century, two modest cave churches were built into the then-solid cliff face. These churches were eventually destroyed as the cliff receded (due to the ongoing expansion of Fira) and an infirmary was built. This building was eventually occupied by Jesuits, who lived on the site until the land was given to the Diocese of Santorini. The current church was built in 1757, and then refurbished and expanded multiple times over the centuries. The structure was heavily damaged in the 1956 Amorgos earthquake, after which the building was restored.

The church's feast day is 15 August.

References 

Roman Catholic churches in Greece
Churches in Santorini
Churches completed in 1757
18th-century churches in Greece